Yapi is a surname. Notable people with the surname include:

Cyril Yapi (born 1980), French footballer
Gilles Yapi Yapo (born 1982), Ivorian footballer

See also
Enerji Yapi-Yol Sen v Turkey, is a European labour law case
Yapi Kredi Bank Azerbaijan, is a bank based in Azerbaijan
Yapi Kredi Publications, is one of the biggest publishing houses in Turkey